Annamaria Orla-Bukowska is a social anthropologist at the Institute of Sociology of the Jagiellonian University in Kraków; and the Professor/Lecturer at the Center for Social Studies / Graduate School for Social Research of the Polish Academy of Sciences in Warsaw. Her general field of research is genocide and its social consequences as well as majority–minority relations. Orla-Bukowska is a 2004 Yad Vashem Fellow.

Rethinking Poles and Jews
Annamaria Orla-Bukowska is the co-author of Rethinking Poles and Jews: Troubled Past, Brighter Future, the 2007 book produced in collaboration with Robert Cherry of Brooklyn College and published in English as well as in Polish under the title Polacy i Żydzi – kwestia otwarta (pictured). It consists of a series of essays devoted to the subject of the Holocaust in Poland; one of the first books to address the negative assumptions and anti-Polish bias in the Holocaust literature. The book was described by Michael C. Steinlauf as "a ray of light amidst the acrimonious and generally uninformed polemics" and by Deborah Lipstadt as "a series of essays that pierce the stereotypes which have obscured historical reality".

Selected works
 Annamaria Orla-Bukowska, Grażyna Skąpska; "The moral fabric in contemporary societies", Institut international de sociologie, Volume 2001. World Congress, 2003. 379 pages
Annamaria Orla-Bukowska, Robert D. Cherry, Rethinking Poles and Jews: troubled past, brighter future, 2007. 230 pages, Holocaust Studies
Annamaria Orla-Bukowska, Robert Cherry, Polacy i Zydzi: Kwestia Otwarta. Warsaw: Wiez. Polish edition of Rethinking Poles and Jews, 2009
Annamaria Orla-Bukowska, Krzysztof Gorlach, Zygmunt Seręga, Family farming in the contemporary world: East-West comparisons, 1995. 187 pages
Annamaria Orla-Bukowska, Book of abstracts: crossing categorical boundaries, Biennial EASA Conference, European Association of Social Anthropologists – 2000. 306 pages

Notes and references

Polish scientists
Polish women scientists
21st-century Polish women writers
Polish anthropologists
Social anthropologists
Academic staff of Jagiellonian University
Living people
Polish women academics
Yad Vashem people
Polish women anthropologists
Year of birth missing (living people)